Brown's Race Historic District is a national historic district located at Rochester in Monroe County, New York. The district contains 15 contributing buildings, 2 contributing structures, and 14 contributing sites.  All of the principal buildings are used for commercial purposes and are sited along or near the curving south rim of the Genesee River gorge at the rim of the High Falls. The district comprises a collection of 19th-century industrial buildings built of brick and stone, and ranging in size from one- to six-stories.  Also in the district is the mill race and the 19th century iron Pont De Rennes bridge, which is used today as a pedestrian bridge and viewing platform of the High Falls and surrounding gorge.

It was listed on the National Register of Historic Places in 1989.

Gallery

See also
 National Register of Historic Places listings in Rochester, New York

References

Historic districts in Rochester, New York
Second Empire architecture in New York (state)
Historic districts on the National Register of Historic Places in New York (state)
National Register of Historic Places in Rochester, New York